Kamuku may refer to:

Kamuku people, an ethnic group in central Nigeria
Kamuku language, spoken by them
Kamuku languages, a group of languages related to Kamuku
Kamuku National Park, a national park in Nigeria

Language and nationality disambiguation pages